Choi Kang-hee (born May 5, 1977) is a South Korean actress and radio DJ. She launched her career by starring in two classic film and television series franchises, Whispering Corridors and School.

Career
Choi Kang-hee made her acting debut in 1995 with a high school drama The New Generation Report: Adults Don't Know. She then went on to appear in the first installment of famed film and series franchises, horror film Whispering Corridors (1998) and television series School (1999), followed by Sweet Buns (2004) and Our Stance on How to Treat a Break-up (also known as Rules of Love, 2005).

In 2006, Choi starred in the low-budget black/romantic comedy film My Scary Girl, which became a critically praised sleeper hit. 

Choi released two popular films in two consecutive years, a 2009 dramedy Goodbye Mom and 2010 romantic comedy Petty Romance, which earned her three Popularity Awards from major film awards: 46th Baeksang Arts Awards and 30th-32nd Blue Dragon Film Awards.

In 2011 Choi starred in a romantic comedy series Protect the Boss. The drama became one of major winners at the SBS Drama Awards. Her next TV dramas were 2013 action romantic comedy 7th Grade Civil Servant and 2015 medical romantic comedy Heart to Heart.

Choi starred in a heavy melodrama without any comedy element after a long time with 2015 series Glamorous Temptation. She then acted in a two seasons series with 2017-2018 procedural comedy Queen of Mystery and its sequel.

In 2020 Choi led the espionage comedy drama Good Casting, 

In 2021, Choi is appearing in fantasy romantic comedy Hello, Me! opposite Kim Young-kwang.

Other activities 
In addition to acting, Choi is a radio DJ on KBS Cool FM. She also has her own clothing brand, Nowhere333.

In October 2006, Choi was awarded a silver medal by the Korea National Red Cross in recognition of her frequent blood donations. A year later she became the first Korean celebrity to donate bone marrow, having pledged as a donor in 1999.

Filmography

Film

Television series

Television show

Music video

Radio shows

Book

Awards and nominations

References

External links

 
 
 

1977 births
Living people
South Korean film actresses
South Korean television actresses
South Korean radio presenters
20th-century South Korean actresses
21st-century South Korean actresses
Actresses from Seoul
South Korean women radio presenters